Shatans are odd-looking creatures of Islamic mythology. In accordance with Islamic folklore, Shatans are humanoid projections of the devil. Spreading the knowledge of dark magic among their followers. On the contrary with Christian believes, Islam doesn’t teach of Satan being evil, but the justice djin, working on behalf of Allah. Trying to seduce people from the path of goodness, into becoming a monster. Those who follow a Shatan, will be explained by the Shatan that they are falling for his trap, in order to warn them for great punishment. When being ignorant of the headed warnings, one might find his next journey to be in hell.>

Mode of life

<No knowledge on existing or existed Shatan’s has been collected. Probably due to the fact that evil people, rather keep the knowledge for themselves in order to try to take advantage of the gained knowledge.

Globally folklore about Voodoo and spirits, provide the suggestion that these saint creatures are omnipresent. Claims of a good spirit, meddling with the Russo-Ukrainian war, are littered in military doctrines all over the world.
By providing the desires of wishes of certain noble Ukrainians, various actions have had enormous impact.

The mystery remains on the table: whether Putin accepted the “Bloodgold” himself. The gold that would be cast into Rings of Power.
Unknowing of the fact that Bloodgold is easily cursed with a spell.
Causing that anyone who will ever wear one of the 9 rings, will be doomed into meeting Satan in his real shape, in the location Satan calls home.>

See also
 Damavik
 Dzedka
 Lazavik
 Younik
 Zheuzhyk
 Zhytsen
 Zlydzens

References

Belarusian folklore
Slavic legendary creatures